Jerry is a given name, usually used for males. It is of Old English origin, and sometimes can be spelled Gerry, Gerrie, Geri, Jery, Jere, Jerrie, or Jeri. It is a diminutive form (hypocorism) of George, Gerald, Gerard, Geraldine, Jared, Jeremy, Jeremiah, Jermaine, or Jerome.

People

Politics
Jerry Bauerly (born 1943), American educator, farmer, businessman, and Minnesota State Representative
Jerry Brown (born 1938), 34th and 39th Governor of California
Jerry Gaetz (1914–1964), member of the North Dakota Senate
Jerry Mateparae (born 1954), New Zealand Governor-General Designate and former Chief of the New Zealand Defence Force
Jerry Rawlings (1947–2020), 1st President of 4th Republic of Ghana
Jerry Sanders (politician) (born 1950), former San Diego mayor and chief of police
Jerry Weyer (born 1986), Luxembourgian politician

Business
Jerry Buss (1933-2013), businessman, sports teams owner, real estate investor, chemist, and philanthropist
Jerry Colangelo (born 1939), American businessman and sports executive
Jerry Greenfield (born 1951), co-founder of Ben & Jerry's ice cream company
Jerry Jones (born 1942), businessman and sport team owner
Jerry Yang (born 1968), co-founder and former CEO of Yahoo!

Arts and entertainment
Jerry Birn (1923–2009), American television writer
Jerry Blavat (born 1940), American radio disc jockey
Jerry Dolyn Brown (born 1942), Alabama folk artist and traditional potter
Jerry Bruckheimer (born 1943), American film and television producer
Jerry Butler (born 1939), American soul singer and songwriter
Jerry Cantrell (born 1966), American guitarist and vocalist for grunge band Alice in Chains
Jerry Clower (1926–1998), American country comedian
Jerry Garcia (1942–1995), American guitarist and vocalist for the American rock band The Grateful Dead
Jerry Goldsmith (1929–2004), American composer and conductor
Jerry Hall (born 1956), American model and actress
Jerry Harris (born 1999), American television personality
Jerry Hausner (1909–1993), American actor
Jerry Houser (born 1952), American actor
Jerry Juhl (1938–2005), American television writer
Jerry Kuehl (1931-2018), historian and tv producer
Jerry Lee Lewis (1935-2022), American singer, songwriter and pianist
Jerry Leiber (1933–2011), American songwriter and record producer
Jerry Lewis (1926–2017), American comedian, actor, film producer, writer, film director, singer and humanitarian
Jerry Martin (composer), American jazz and New Age composer and video game creator
Jerry Naylor (1939–2019), American country and rock and roll recording artist
Jerry Nelson (1934–2012), American actor and puppeteer
Jerry O'Connell (born 1974), American actor
Jerry Orbach (1935–2004), American actor
Jerry Ragovoy (1930–2011), American songwriter and record producer 
Jerry Reed (1937–2008), American country singer and guitarist
Jerry Roush (born 1986), former vocalist of the metalcore bands Sky Eats Airplane, Of Mice & Men, and Glass Cloud
Jerry Scott (born 1955), American cartoonist and writer
Jerry Seinfeld (born 1954), American comedian, actor and writer
Jerry Spinelli (born 1941), American writer of young adult fiction
Jerry Springer (born 1944), American TV personality and former mayor of Cincinnati, Ohio
Jerry Trainor (born 1977), American actor and comedian
Jerry Vale (1930–2014), American singer
Jerry Van Dyke (born 1931), American actor and comedian
Jerry Wallace (1928–2008), American singer
Jerry Weintraub (born 1937), American film and television producer
Jerry Yan (born 1977), Taiwanese actor

Sports
Jerry Anderson (1953–1989), American football safety player
Jerry Balisok (1955–2013), American professional wrestler
Jerry Blackwell (1949–1995), American professional wrestler
Jerry Brown (gridiron football) (1987–2012), American football player
Jerry Buchek (1942–2019), American baseball player
Jerry Goff (born 1964), American baseball player
Jerry Gustafson (born 1934), American football player
Jerry Jacobs (American football) (born 1997), American football player
Jerry Jeudy (born 1999), American football player
Jerry Kiernan (born 1953), Irish long-distance runner
Jerry Kindall (1935–2017), American baseball player
Jerry Lawler (born 1949), American musician, professional wrestler and commentator
Jerry Lyne, basketball coach
Jerry Lynn (born 1963), American retired professional wrestler
Jerry Lynn (baseball) (1916–1972), Major League Baseball second baseman
Jerry Mansfield (1892-1960), American football player
Jerry Marion (born 1944), American football player
Jerry Norman (basketball) (born 1929/1930), American basketball coach
Jerry Rice (born 1962), American football player
Jerry Saggs (born 1964), American professional wrestler 
Jerry Sandusky (born 1944), American football coach and convicted sex offender
Jerry Schild (1954—2012), former NASCAR Cup Series driver
Jerry Simon (born 1968), American-Israeli basketball player
Jerry Sitoe (born 1990), Mozambican footballer
Jerry Sloan (1942–2020), American basketball player and coach
Jerry Stackhouse (born 1974), American basketball player
Jerry Stubbs (born 1951), American retired professional wrestler
Jerry Tillery (born 1996), American football player
Jerry Watford (1930-1993), American football player
Jerry West (born 1938), American basketball player

Other
Jerry Coleby-Williams, Australian conservationist, horticulturalist and plant curator
Jerry Coyne (born 1949), American biologist
Jerry Doggett (1916–1997), American sportscaster
Jerry Dunphy (1921–2002), American television news anchor 
Jerry Falwell (1933–2007), American Baptist pastor and televangelist
Jerry Falwell Jr. (born 1962), American attorney and former president of Liberty University
Jerry Johnston (born 1959), American clergyman 
Jerry Kang, American legal scholar and academic administrator
Jerry Krause (disappeared 2013), Missing aviator
Jerry Lawson (1940-2011), Engineer
Jerry Magee (1928–2019), American journalist
Jerry Parr (1930–2015), retired United States Secret Service agent
Jerry Taft (1943–2020), American meteorologist
Jerry Whitworth (born 1939), member of the Walker family spy ring
Jerry Yang, winner of the 2007 World Series of Poker Main Event
Xiangzhong "Jerry" Yang (1959–2009), biotechnology scientist who worked on cloning

Fictional characters
 Jerry, a fictional character from the game Undertale
 Jerry, the name of multiple pre-life beings in film Soul
 Jerry Recycled Batteries, also known as Peterbilt, a red truck character in the animated film Cars
 Jerry Bear, a fictional bear in the Sprout show Pajanimals
 Jerry Cruncher, in the novel A Tale of Two Cities by Charles Dickens
 Jerry Gergich, a fictional character in the TV series Parks and Recreation
 Jerry Gourd, a fictional character in the Christian video series VeggieTales
 Jerry Lewis, a fictional character in the TV series Totally Spies!
 the title character in the film Jerry Maguire, portrayed by Tom Cruise
Jerry Martin, character in the film The Divorcee
 Jerry Martinez, the main antagonist of the video game Grand Theft Auto: Vice City Stories
 Jerry Mouse, in the Tom and Jerry cartoons
 Jerry Russo, from the television series Wizards of Waverly Place
 Jerry Seinfeld (character), eponymous character in the American sitcom Seinfeld
 Jerry Slugworth, a scare floor manager in the animated film Monsters, Inc.
 Jerry Smith, a fictional character in the American animated series Rick and Morty
 Jerry Stokes, in the short-lived television series Welcome to Eltingville
 Jerry the Tyke, a fictional dog who had his own cartoon series between 1925 and 1927

See also
Jer (disambiguation)
Jeri
Geri (disambiguation)

References

English feminine given names
English given names
English-language masculine given names
English masculine given names
English unisex given names
Hypocorisms